João Moreira Sanmartin Souza (born 25 May 2004), known as João Moreira or simply Moreira, is a professional footballer who plays as a defender for São Paulo. Born in Brazil, he has represented Portugal at youth level.

Career statistics

Club

Notes

References

External links

2004 births
Living people
Footballers from São Paulo
Portuguese footballers
Portugal youth international footballers
Brazilian footballers
Brazilian people of Portuguese descent
Naturalised citizens of Portugal
São Paulo FC players
Association football defenders